Bill Evans Trio with Symphony Orchestra is an album by American jazz pianist Bill Evans and his trio, released in 1966. The group is accompanied by an orchestra arranged and conducted by Claus Ogerman.

Reception 

Scott Yanow stated in his Allmusic review: "This collaboration... is predictably dull... one of Bill Evans' least significant recordings, a weak third stream effort." In contrast, Roger Crane states in his All About Jazz review "Although dismissed by some critics, this CD, with arrangements by Claus Ogermann, is very lovely. Evans was very proud of this album. Ogermann's charts are sweetly romantic rather than overbearing, and this gives Evans and his trio (with bassist Chuck Israels and drummer Grady Tate) room to maneuver. Evans' composition "My Bells" is one of the stronger cuts."

Track listing
 "Granadas" (after The Maiden and the Nightingale by Enrique Granados) – 5:54
 "Valse" (after the 2nd movement Siciliano of the flute sonata BWV 1031 by Johann Sebastian Bach) – 5:52
 "Prelude" (Alexander Scriabin) – 3:01
 "Time Remembered" (Bill Evans) – 4:10
 "Pavane" (Gabriel Fauré) – 4:01
 "Elegia (Elegy)" (Claus Ogerman) – 5:12
 "My Bells" (Evans) – 3:48
 "Blue Interlude" (Frédéric Chopin) – 6:04

Personnel
Bill Evans – piano
Chuck Israels – bass
Larry Bunker – drums
Grady Tate – drums (some sources state that Tate performed on the album but he is not credited in the CD booklet) 
Unidentified strings, woodwinds and brass arranged and conducted by Claus Ogerman

Production
Creed Taylor – producer
Rudy Van Gelder – recording engineer

References

External links
BETSO Album Page at Verve
 BETSO Album page with reviews at Amazon UK
The Bill Evans Memorial Library
Bill Evans discography at Jazz Discography

Bill Evans albums
1966 albums
Albums produced by Creed Taylor
Albums arranged by Claus Ogerman
Verve Records albums
Albums conducted by Claus Ogerman